Brian Dale Baschnagel (born January 8, 1954) is a former American football player. He played wide receiver in the National Football League (NFL) for the Chicago Bears.

Early life
Brian Baschnagel's family relocated often due to his father's professional responsibilities and moved to the northern suburbs of Pittsburgh, Pennsylvania when he was in his early teens.  Baschnagel attended North Allegheny High School (Pittsburgh PA) and was a running back on the North Allegheny football team.  Baschnagel was the first running back in WPIAL history to rush for over 400 yards in a single game.

According to an article in the Pittsburgh Post-Gazette, Baschnagel rushed for 409 yards in a 1971 game against Sto Rox.  According to an article in the Pittsburgh Tribune-Review, Baschnagel then set a WPIAL rushing record that would stand for 17 years when he ran for 432 yards in a 1972 game.

College
Baschnagel attended Ohio State University after graduating from North Allegheny High School.  Initially, Baschnagel was a running back but then was converted to a receiver (wing back).  In addition to his position as a starting player on the Ohio State football team, Baschnagel was a two-time Academic All-American (1974, 1975) and a recipient of the National Football Foundation and Hall of Fame scholarship award (1975).

NFL
Baschnagel was selected by the Chicago Bears in the third round of the 1976 NFL Draft. He wore jersey #47 in his rookie year, which he began as a defensive back, and #84 the remainder of his career with the Bears after moving back to receiver. Contrary to popular belief, Baschnagel was not on the active roster in 1985 when the Bears went 18–1 en route to a Super Bowl victory. He injured his knee in training camp and spent the entire 1985 season on IR. However, he did travel with the team that year, assisted the coaches from the coaching booth, and helped in practice after he recovered from his injury. He received a Super Bowl ring after the Bears' dominant Super Bowl XX win.

Personal life
Baschnagel is married, the father of three children, and currently works for North American Corp. in Glenview IL. In 2013, it was announced that Baschnagel would be inducted into the West Pennsylvania Sports Hall of Fame.

References

1954 births
Living people
Sportspeople from Kingston, New York
American football wide receivers
Ohio State Buckeyes football players
Ohio State University alumni
Chicago Bears players
Players of American football from Pittsburgh
Brian Piccolo Award winners